Kedarnatha is a genus of flowering plants belonging to the family Apiaceae.

Its native range is Himalaya to Northern Myanmar.

Species:
Kedarnatha garhwalica 
Kedarnatha hameliana 
Kedarnatha meifolia 
Kedarnatha oreomyrrhiformis 
Kedarnatha sanctuarii 
Kedarnatha vaginata

References

Apioideae
Apioideae genera